Huron High School is a public high school in Huron, Ohio.  It is the only high school in the Huron City Schools district.  The athletic teams are known as the Huron Tigers.  The school is a member of the Sandusky Bay Conference (SBC).

Athletics

Championships

Ohio High School Athletic Association

State championships:
 Boys' track and field – 1974
 Girls' basketball – 1983
 Girls' volleyball – 1999, 2002, 2009, 2014, 2020
 Boys' football – 1953

Notable alumni
 Jim Campbell, former MLB executive (Detroit Tigers)
 Matt Maloney, former MLB player (Cincinnati Reds, Minnesota Twins)
 Cody Thompson, current NFL player (Seattle Seahawks)

References

External links
 District Website

High schools in Erie County, Ohio
Public high schools in Ohio
High School